Not in My Airforce (1996) is the debut solo album by American indie rock musician Robert Pollard, released simultaneously with Tobin Sprout's Carnival Boy, just as the "classic" Guided by Voices lineup was dissolving.

In 2007, Pollard launched a new record label, Prom Is Coming Records, which took its name from a track off this album.

Track listing
"Maggie Turns to Flies"   – 3:14  
"Quicksilver"   – 1:06  
"Girl Named Captain"   – 2:02  
"Get Under It"   – 2:21  
"Release the Sunbird"   – 1:53  
"John Strange School"   – 1:15  
"Parakeet Troopers"   – 1:34  
"One Clear Minute"   – 0:48  
"Chance to Buy an Island"   – 2:27  
"I've Owned You for Centuries"   – 1:22  
"The Ash Gray Proclamation"   – 2:32  
"Flat Beauty"   – 1:50  
"King of Arthur Avenue"   – 1:37  
"Roofer's Union Fight Song"   – 1:31  
"Psychic Pilot Clocks Out"   – 4:02  
"Prom Is Coming"   – 1:55  
"Party"   – 0:44  
"Did It Play?"   – 0:59  
"Double Standards Inc."   – 1:23  
"Punk Rock Gods"   – 0:52  
"Meet My Team"   – 1:04  
"Good Luck Sailor"   – 0:48

Personnel

Musicians 

Robert Pollard – vocals, guitar, bass guitar, organ
Kevin Fennell – drums
John Shough – bass, organ
Jim Pollard – percussion (track 1)
Jim Shepard – vocals (track 8), guitar (track 16)
Matt Sweeney – guitar, vocals (track 2)
Tobin Sprout – backing vocals (track 14)
Dan Toohey – bass guitar (track 7)
Mitch Mitchell – percussion (track 1)
Steve Wilbur – slide guitar (track 15)

Technical 

 Mark Ohe – cover artwork
 Robert Pollard – cover artwork
 Roger Seibel – mastering
 John Shough – engineering (tracks 1, 3-6, 9, 12, 13, 15, 17-22)
 Jim Pollard – technician
 Mitch Mitchell – engineering (track 11)
 Robert Pollard – engineering (tracks 8-16)

References

1996 albums
Robert Pollard albums